Clara Johnson Scroggins was a collector and author on the subject of Christmas ornaments, and was considered an expert in the field as well.

Biography
Scroggins started collecting ornaments in 1972 following the unexpected and sudden death of her then-husband from a cerebral hemorrhage a few weeks before Christmas. She recounted that she "needed something to really consume me, to help me." In a jewelry store she purchased a second edition Reed and Barton silver Christmas cross and started researching how to obtain a first edition one. By the following year, Scroggins's had collected nearly 1,000 silver and silverplated ornaments from past years and editions. Through meetings with secondary market dealers and other collectors, she learned about ornament values and eventually documented ornament history.

Scroggins's collection grew to 40,000 Christmas ornaments, from manufacturers such as Hallmark Cards, American Greetings, Bacarrat, Cartier, Enesco, Gucci, Lenox, Orrefors, Pfaltzgraff, Precious Moments, Rosenthal, Royal Doulton, Tiffany, Waterford, Wedgewood and materials including German keugel or blown-glass, porcelain, pewter, tin, paper, and crystal. Many ornaments in the collection are from Europe, particularly Germany. By 1994,  Scroggins's ornament collection numbered 250,000 pieces.

Scroggins was the author of a number of books about Christmas ornament collecting, values and history. She focused her writing on ornaments from Hallmark Cards because they were the most popular at the time.

In 1973, Hallmark Cards started manufacturing Christmas ornaments. The first collection of 18 ornaments, including six glass ball ornaments. Hallmark Keepsake Ornaments are dated and available for just one year. In 1996, the ornament industry generated $2.4 billion in total annual sales, an increase of 25% over the previous year. Industry experts estimated more than 22 million US households collected Christmas ornaments, and that 75% of those households collected Hallmark Keepsake Ornaments.
By 1998, 11 million American households collected Hallmark ornaments, and 250,000 people were members of the Keepsake Ornament Collector's Club.  There were as many as 400 local Keepsake Ornament Collector's Club chapters in the US.

Scroggins was instrumental in influencing Hallmark Cards to introduce African American-themed ornaments, including its first Black Christmas ornament, "Cheerful Santa" in 1992.  She also wrote an ornament column for Collector's Mart - The Magazine of Art Collectibles.

Publications

References

External References

1931 births
2019 deaths
African-American writers
American collectors
Women collectors
20th-century African-American people
21st-century African-American people